Elzéar Bédard (24 July 1799 – 11 August 1849) was a lawyer and a member of the Legislative Assembly of Lower Canada. He later became a judge.

He was born at Quebec City in 1799, the son of Pierre-Stanislas Bédard. Bédard received a typical education for the time which he completed in 1818. He then pursued a career in the priesthood but abandoned this and in 1819 articled to become a lawyer which took place in 1824. By 1830, he was involved in provincial politics and ran unsuccessfully in Kamouraska. He won a by-election in 1832 for Montmorency, a riding left vacant by Philippe Panet. He aligned himself with Louis-Joseph Papineau's Patriote party program and in 1834 was the member who introduced the Ninety-Two Resolutions, although likely he did not have a significant role in the preparation.

He was the first mayor of Quebec City, (1833–1834), but lost the next election to René-Édouard Caron. A close friend and supporter of Lord Gosford, he was appointed a judge of the Court of King's Bench in 1836, an appointment that was called bribery by his radical adversaries in the Patriote party.

Bédard was a political moderate at a time when a more extreme outlook was held by most politicians and this stance brought him some adversity and misfortune during his political life.

External links 
 
 

1799 births
1849 deaths
Judges in Quebec
Lawyers in Quebec
Members of the Legislative Assembly of Lower Canada
Mayors of Quebec City
Lower Canada judges